This is a list of sites in Minnesota which are included in the National Register of Historic Places. There are more than 1,700 properties and historic districts listed on the NRHP; each of Minnesota's 87 counties has at least 2 listings. Twenty-two sites are also National Historic Landmarks.

 Aitkin
 Anoka
 Becker
 Beltrami
 Benton
 Big Stone
 Blue Earth
 Brown
 Carlton
 Carver
 Cass
 Chippewa
 Chisago
 Clay
 Clearwater
 Cook
 Cottonwood
 Crow Wing
 Dakota
 Dodge
 Douglas
 Faribault
 Fillmore
 Freeborn
 Goodhue
 Grant
 Hennepin
 Houston
 Hubbard
 Isanti
 Itasca
 Jackson
 Kanabec
 Kandiyohi
 Kittson
 Koochiching
 Lac qui Parle
 Lake
 Lake of the Woods
 Le Sueur
 Lincoln
 Lyon
 Mahnomen
 Marshall
 Martin
 McLeod
 Meeker
 Mille Lacs
 Morrison
 Mower
 Murray
 Nicollet
 Nobles
 Norman
 Olmsted
 Otter Tail
 Pennington
 Pine
 Pipestone
 Polk
 Pope
 Ramsey
 Red Lake
 Redwood
 Renville
 Rice
 Rock
 Roseau
 St. Louis
 Scott
 Sherburne
 Sibley
 Stearns
 Steele
 Stevens
 Swift
 Todd
 Traverse
 Wabasha
 Wadena
 Waseca
 Washington
 Watonwan
 Wilkin
 Winona
 Wright
 Yellow Medicine

Minneapolis listings are in the Hennepin County list;  St. Paul's listings are in the Ramsey County list.

Current listings by county
The following are approximate tallies of current listings by county. These counts are based on entries in the National Register Information Database as of April 24, 2008 and new weekly listings posted since then on the National Register of Historic Places web site. There are frequent additions to the listings and occasional delistings and the counts here are approximate and not official. New entries are added to the official Register on a weekly basis.  Also, the counts in this table exclude boundary increase and decrease listings which modify the area covered by an existing property or district and which carry a separate National Register reference number. The numbers of NRHP listings in each county are documented by tables in each of the individual county list-articles.

Aitkin County

Anoka County

Becker County

Beltrami County

Benton County

|}

Former listings

|}

Big Stone County

Blue Earth County

Brown County

Carlton County

Carver County

Cass County

Chippewa County

Chisago County

Clay County

Clearwater County

|}

Cook County

Cottonwood County

|}

Crow Wing County

Dakota County

Dodge County

Douglas County

Faribault County

Fillmore County

Freeborn County

|}

Former listings

|}

Goodhue County

Grant County

|}

Hennepin County

Houston County

Hubbard County 

|}

Former listing

|}

Isanti County

Itasca County

Jackson County

|}

Former listings

|}

Kanabec County

|}

Former listings

|}

Kandiyohi County

Kittson County

|}

Koochiching County

Lac qui Parle County

Lake County

Lake of the Woods County

|}

Former listing

|}

Le Sueur County

Lincoln County

|}

Lyon County

Mahnomen County

|}

Marshall County

|}

Martin County

McLeod County

|}

Former listings

|}

Meeker County

Mille Lacs County

Morrison County

Mower County

Murray County

Nicollet County

Nobles County

Norman County

|}

Former listings

|}

Olmsted County

Otter Tail County

Pennington County

|}

Pine County

Pipestone County

Polk County

|}

Pope County

Ramsey County

Red Lake County

|}

Redwood County

Renville County

|}

Rice County

Rock County

Roseau County

|}

St. Louis County

Scott County

Sherburne County

|}

Former listing

|}

Sibley County

|}

Stearns County

Steele County

Stevens County

|}

Swift County

Todd County

Traverse County

|}

Wabasha County

Wadena County

|}

Waseca County

Washington County

Watonwan County

|}

Wilkin County

|}

Former listings

|}

Winona County

Wright County

Yellow Medicine County 

|}

See also

 List of National Historic Landmarks in Minnesota
 National Register of Historic Places listings in Voyageurs National Park

References 

Minnesota